Ezzat El Kamhawi is an Egyptian novelist and journalist. In December 2012, El Kamhawi was awarded the Naguib Mahfouz Medal for Literature for his novel House of the Wolf. In June 2022 he was awarded the Samir Kassir Award for Freedom of the Press (Opinion Piece category) for his article "Suspicious architecture: The obsession with grand buildings and wide streets".

He was born in 1961 and graduated from the department of journalism in the Faculty of Mass Communications, Cairo University in 1983.

Early life and career 
El Kamhawi was born on 23 December 1961 in Sharqia Governorate, Egypt, before graduating from high school he had articles published for him in the Al Gomhuria newspaper.

After graduating from the department of journalism in the Faculty of Mass Communications, Cairo University, he started working for Al-Akhbar, where he helped establish Akhbar Al-Adab 10 years later, a widely known literature magazine. He was the Senior Editor of al-Doha Cultural Magazine from May 2011 until September 2013.

The City of Pleasure

A city like no other, guarded by the goddess of pleasure and, ruled by a licentious king who dedicated his time to carnal pleasures  and a princess who dreams of love and tender empathy. The priests decide to design the walls of the princess's room with figures of embracing lovers and burnt incense and chanted their magical incantations that the pictures on the wall may come to life and the dream of the princess for true love  might come true.
 
People real and shadowy, strong slaves and emperors have met their doom at the gates of the City of Pleasure. Eventually the   gates of the impenetrable city succumbs under the charm of   two ingenious commodities: fried potatoes and pepsi-cola. 
No one knows the real history of the City of Pleasure and no welcome visitor has ever escaped its enchantment.
 
This is the novel that has been structured from human myths melted down and recreated one of the most perfectly executed literary whims. It is no longer possible to speak of modern Arabic literary narrative without including The City of Pleasure and the enriching addition it has provided to the art of the  modern Arabic novel par excellence.

Works
His published literary works include:

It Happened in the land of Dust and Mud (Stories) (published by Dar Soad Al Sabbah in 1992).
The City of Pleasure (Novel) (published by the General Organization for Cultural Centers in 1997 - second edition by "el-Ain publishing" in 2009).
Times for Joy (Stories) (published by the General Organization for Cultural Centers in 2000).
The Grove of Sadness and Bliss (published by "Dar el-Hilal" in 2003).
A room overlooking the Nile (Novel) (published by "Merit Publishing House" in 2004 in Cairo, and "Dar Al Howar" in 2004 Latakia, Syria - second edition by "Merit Publishing House" in 2006 - third edition by "maktabet Al-a'osra"  in 2010).
The Guard (Novel) (published by "el-Ain publishing", Cairo 2008).
Book seductiveness (published by "el-Ain publishing", Cairo 2009).
House of the Wolf (Beit Al-Deeb) (Published in Arabic by "Dar Al-Adab", Beirut 2010), (Published in English by AUC Press, Cairo 2013).
Gold and Glass (Published by "Nahdet Misr", Cairo 2011).
Shame from both sides (Published by "el-Ain publishing", Cairo 2011).
The sea behind the curtains (Published by "Dar Al-Adab", Beirut 2013).
The sky in an imminent way short stories (Published by "Batanna", Cairo 2016).
At least we are together (Published by the "Egyptian Lebanese House", Cairo 2017). Sheikh Zayed Book Award’s Short-list (2018).
 What Sami Jacoub saw (Published by the "Egyptian Lebanese House", Cairo 2019).

 The Passengers Hall (Published by the "Egyptian Lebanese House", Cairo 2020). 

 Strangers at Home (Published by the "Egyptian Lebanese House", Cairo 2021). 
 The Grove of Sadness and Bliss - extended edition - (Published by the "Egyptian Lebanese House", Cairo 2022).

Recognition 

 2012: Naguib Mahfouz Medal for Literature for his novel House of the Wolf.

 2018: At least we are together reaches the 2018 short-list of Sheikh Zayed Book Award. 

 2021: The Passengers Hall reaches the 2021 short-list of Sheikh Zayed Book Award.

 2022: Strangers at Home reaches the 2022 short-list of Sheikh Zayed Book Award.

 2022: Samir Kassir Award for Freedom of the Press (Opinion Piece category) for his article "Suspicious architecture: The obsession with grand buildings and wide streets".

References

External links 
 Official website of Ezzat El Kamhawi
 Ezzat el Kamhawi on Twitter
 Ezzat El Kamhawi's Facebook profile
 Ezzat El Kamhawi's Facebook page

Egyptian novelists
Egyptian journalists
1961 births
Living people
Cairo University alumni
People from Sharqia Governorate
Recipients of the Naguib Mahfouz Medal for Literature